Blessed Unrest is a 2007 book by Paul Hawken

Blessed Unrest may also refer to:
 Blessed Unrest (album), by The Holy Sea
 The Blessed Unrest, a 2013 album by Sara Bareilles